Kot Chutta is a tehsil administrative subdivision of Dera Ghazi Khan District in the Punjab Province of Pakistan. Kot Chutta is situated off the Indus Highway.

The area is known for its fertile agricultural land and for the production of various crops. Its major union councils are Choti Zareen, Jhoke Uttra, Basti Malana and Jhakkar Imam sharif. Languages spoken are Saraiki, Balochi, Urdu and Pashto. 90% of the area's population is Saraiki speaking.

History

It was founded in the 17th century same time when Ghazi Khan Mirani invaded Dera Ghazi Khan.
This city was founded by Sardar Chutta Khan Gurmani who was the head of Gurmani Baloch tribe. It was taken into government rule after the partition of British India. Many migrants from the sub-continent settled here.

The city was given the position of Tehsil in 2010.

Health 
Every union council has a rural health department along with one tehsil headquarter hospital. The THQ was given 2 Ambulances for any emergency services.

References

Populated places in Dera Ghazi Khan District
Tehsils of Punjab, Pakistan